Zhang Jin (born 19 May 1974), also known as Max Zhang, is a Chinese actor and former wushu athlete who won the Best Supporting Actor at the 33rd Hong Kong Film Awards.

Career 
Zhang began his career as a stunt actor, notably in Crouching Tiger, Hidden Dragon (2000) as the stunt double for Zhang Ziyi, with whom he later collaborated as a screen actor in My Lucky Star (2013) and The Grandmaster (2013). He also starred in Rise of the Legend in 2014, SPL II: A Time for Consequences and Ip Man 3  in 2015, The Brink in 2017, Master Z: The Ip Man Legacy in 2018 and Escape Plan: The Extractors in 2019. He also appears in a small minor role in Pacific Rim Uprising (2018). In 2021, he joined the cast of reality tv show Call Me By Fire as a contestant.

Personal life 
On 12 January 2008, Zhang married Ada Choi, a Hong Kong actress, they are both Protestant Christians. They have two daughters, Zoe and Chloe. On 15 November 2019, they had a son nicknamed "Le Er".

Filmography

Film Movies

TV Series

TV Shows

Awards and nominations

References

External links
 
 
 Max Zhang at chinesemov.com
 John Zhang Jin at hkmdb.com

1974 births
Male actors from Chongqing
Living people
20th-century Chinese male actors
21st-century Chinese male actors
Chinese male film actors
Sichuanese Protestants
Hong Kong Protestants